Blue Moon is the debut studio album of country music artist Steve Holy. Released in 2000 on Curb Records, the album produced four hit singles on the Billboard Hot Country Singles & Tracks (now Hot Country Songs) charts. The first one, "Don't Make Me Beg", peaked at No. 29 on the charts, and its follow-ups (the title track and "The Hunger", respectively) both reached No. 24. Following "The Hunger," Holy charted with "Good Morning Beautiful," which he recorded for the soundtrack to the film Angel Eyes. After this song reached Number One, Curb re-issued the album with "Good Morning Beautiful" as a bonus track.

The album was produced by Wilbur C. Rimes, the father of female country music singer LeAnn Rimes.

On February 24, 2009 it was certified Gold by the RIAA.

Critical reception
Jonathan Widran of Allmusic gave the album four stars out of five, comparing Holy's voice to that of Chris Isaak and saying that, although he did not think that Holy showed a distinct musical personality, the album was a "likeable, colorful listening experience."

Track listing

Personnel
As listed in liner notes.
Rita Baloche - background vocals
Mike Brignardello - bass guitar
Perry Coleman - background vocals
Austin Deptula - programming 
Milo Deering - steel guitar, acoustic guitar, nylon string guitar, fiddle, Dobro, mandolin
Randy Fouts - piano, keyboards
Steve Holy - lead vocals, background vocals
Annagrey LaBasse - background vocals
Gary Leach - keyboards, background vocals, organ, electric guitar, acoustic guitar
B. James Lowry - electric guitar, acoustic guitar
David Pruitt - background vocals
Curtis Randall - bass guitar
Brent Rowan - electric guitar
John D. Sharp - background vocals
John R. Sharp - background vocals
Marty Walsh - electric guitar, acoustic guitar
Chris Wann - background vocals
Matthew Ward - background vocals
Dan Wojciechowski - drums

Additional background vocals on "Don't Make Me Beg" by Dan Wojciechowski, Curtis Randall, Marty Walsh, Milo Deering, Randy Fouts, and Gary Leach.

Chart performance

Weekly charts

Year-end charts

Singles

Certifications

References

2000 debut albums
Steve Holy albums
Curb Records albums